Maria Leitner (born 30 December 1981) is an Italian ice hockey player. She competed in the women's tournament at the 2006 Winter Olympics.

References

1981 births
Living people
Italian women's ice hockey players
Olympic ice hockey players of Italy
Ice hockey players at the 2006 Winter Olympics
Sportspeople from Sterzing